Michael Jeffrey Balick (born 1952) is an American ethnobotanist, economic botanist, and pharmacognosist, known as a leading expert on medicinal and toxic plants, biocultural conservation and the plant family Arecaceae (palms).

Education and career
Michael J. Balick graduated in 1975 with B.Sc. in agriculture and plant sciences from the University of Delaware, after spending the academic year 1972–1972 at Tel Aviv University. At Harvard University he graduated with M.Sc. in 1976 and Ph.D. in 1980, where he also attended Harvard Business School. At the New York Botanical Garden (NYBG) he was from 1980 to 1989 an associate curator and the executive assistant to NYBG's president and is since 1989 NYBG's Philecology Curator of Economic Botany. In 1981 he was the co-founder, with Ghillean Prance, of NYBG's Institute of Economic Botany and since 1990 has been the institute's director. Balick has been an adjunct professor at Columbia University, Fordham University, the City University of New York, New York University, and Yale University.

Balick has worked in ethnobotany and ethnomedicine in remote areas of the tropics with people of indigenous cultures, as well as in New York City with people having traditional herbal knowledge from China and the Caribbean. From 1974 to 1975 he lived in Costa Rica and helped build the Wilson Botanical Garden at the Las Cruces Biological Station. From 1975 to 1997 he was a frequent researcher in Amazonia, where he studied palms and their local uses. He has done research and taught university courses in "ethnobotany and ethnomedicine, phytochemistry, floristics and conservation biology."

In 1979, he was the first to receive 'The George H.M. Lawrence Memorial Award', in the amount of $2,000, presented by the Hunt Institute for Botanical Documentation, Carnegie Mellon University and presented at the annual banquet of the Botanical Society of America.

Balick is the author or co-author of more than 160 scientific articles or book chapters. He is also the author, co-author, editor, or co-editor of thirty books and monographs, varied among scientific and general interest. He has been a co-collector with more than two dozen botanists, including Brian M. Boom, Andrew J. Henderson, and Ghillean Prance. Balick has been doing research with Gregory M. Plunkett on the plants and ethnobotany of Vanuatu's Tafea Province.

Among his academic and professional honors, Balick was elected in 1999 a Fellow of the American Association for the Advancement of Science (AAAS) and in 2004 received the AAAS International Award for Scientific Cooperation. In 2018 he received the David Fairchild Medal for Plant Exploration of the National Tropical Botanical Garden and in 2020 the H. Marc Cathey Award for outstanding scientific research that has enriched horticulture and plant science from the American Horticultural Society. He is a founding member of the Daylight Academy, a scientific academy based in Zurich, Switzerland. For the academic year 2005-2006 he was a Guggenheim Fellow. He was the president of the Society for Economic Botany in 1992 and in 2009 was a recipient of the Society's Distinguished Economic Botanist award. He is married to Emily Lewis Penn, a New York City realtor and poet.

Selected publications

Articles

Books
 
 
 
 
 
 
 
 
 
 
 
 
 
 
Dahmer, S.; Balick, Michael J.; Hillmann-Kitalong, Ann, et al. (2018). Palau Primary Health Care Manual: Health Care in Palau, Combining Conventional Treatments and Traditional Uses of Plants for Health and Healing. The New York Botanical Garden, Ministry of Health, Republic of Palau, Belau National Museum.  
Nelson, L.S.; Balick, Michael J. (2020). Handbook of Poisonous and Injurious Plants, Third Edition. Springer Science and Business Media, New York Botanical Garden. .
Balick, Michael J.; Hillmann-Kitalong, Ann (2020). Ethnobotany of Palau: Plants, People and Island Culture, Volume 1. Belau National Museum/The New York Botanical Garden.  . 
Balick, Michael J.; Hillmann-Kitalong, Ann (2020). Ethnobotany of Palau: Plants, People and Island Culture, Volume 2. Belau National Museum/The New York Botanical Garden. . 
Balick, Michael J.; Cox, Paul Alan (2020) Plants, People and Culture: The Science of Ethnobotany, 2nd Edition.  Taylor and Francis Group/CRC Press. .

References

External links
 
 
  (June 19, 2015 lecture by Drs. Michael J. Balick and Rosita Arvigo at the New York Botanical Garden)
  (introductory ethnobotany class at the University of Hawaii at Mānoa)

1952 births
Living people
Ethnobotanists
Economic botanists
Plant collectors
20th-century American botanists
21st-century American botanists
University of Delaware alumni
Harvard Graduate School of Arts and Sciences alumni
New York Botanical Garden
Fellows of the American Association for the Advancement of Science